Tupinambis quadrilineatus, the four-lined tegu, is a species of lizard in the family Teiidae. It is endemic to Brazil.

References

Tupinambis
Reptiles described in 1997
Taxa named by Paulo Roberto Manzani
Taxa named by Augusto Shinya Abe